A Banquet of Consequences is a crime novel by Elizabeth George. It reached 19 on the 2015 best sellers list of the New York Times.

References 

2015 American novels
American mystery novels
Viking Press books
Hodder & Stoughton books